Dolcoath mine was a copper and tin mine in Camborne, Cornwall, England, United Kingdom. Its name derives from the Cornish for 'Old Ground', and it was also affectionately known as The Queen of Cornish  Mines. The site is north-west of Carn Brea. Dolcoath Road runs between the A3047 road and Chapel Hill. The site is south of this road.

History
The mineral rights were owned by the Basset family of Tehidy who are recorded on a deed in 1588 as leasing the ground to a family called Crane. The mine closed in 1787 because the large amount of copper ore that was being cheaply mined from Parys Mountain on Anglesey had depressed the price. However the price of copper slowly recovered and the mine reopened in 1799.

Of around 470 copper-producing mines in Cornwall and Devon, Dolcoath became the fifth largest. But as depth increased the copper died out, and by 1832 the mine was in danger of closing. However the mine captain, Charles Thomas, was convinced that tin ore would be found deeper down and after disagreements with the shareholders his faith was repaid and the first tin dividend was paid in 1853.

In 1893 there was a major accident at the 412-fathom level (see below). In 1895 it took men employed in the lower levels between 2 and 3 hours to go down and return to the surface, so they could not work more than 4–5 hours a day.

The pumping engine that worked this shaft dated from 1815; a piece of the cast iron bob from this engine is preserved in the collection of the Trevithick Society. This engine originally had a  cylinder, but this had to be replaced with an  cylinder when it was not powerful enough to cope with the deepening shaft. The rebuilt engine was so large that there was not enough room in the engine house for the stairs, so a unique wooden extension was built on the back to house them.

In 1895 it was decided to reconstruct the company as a limited company, replacing the old cost book system under which most Cornish mines had traditionally been run. A new shaft, named the Williams Shaft after the first chairman of the new company, was started in October 1895, intended to be the first  vertical shaft in Cornwall. It was completed in 1910 and came into use the next year.

In 1920 when the mine had become virtually worked out and following the tin price collapse (new deposits were also being found elsewhere in the world) Dolcoath finally closed. The company was reconstructed in 1923 when fresh capital was raised and a new  circular shaft was sited north of the old mine at Roskear. The New Dolcoath Mine was actually an amalgamation of several smaller mines including Stray Park and Roskear. In 1936 Dolcoath's sett was purchased by South Crofty.

Major accident

On 20 September 1893 a party of miners was strengthening a large stull at the 412 level (nearly half a mile underground). The day before, the mine captain, Josiah Thomas, and Captain James Johns, the chief underground agent, had visited the level and expressed concern at the safety of the stull because one of the pieces was bending. Men were immediately instructed to strengthen it. Repair work proceeded through the morning until at 1 pm after a small fall of rock, the whole stull suddenly gave way, killing seven of the men working underneath. One man, Richard Davies, was rescued unhurt after 37 hours. In around 1898 the then mine captain, Arthur Thomas, reported that Davies went to America some time after, and then worked in South Africa.

At the subsequent inquest, Captain Josiah Thomas said that the working party must have removed some of the old props before putting in the new ones, but this was contradicted by one of the survivors who reported that the men were doing nothing at the time to cause the fall.

Output
Before its first closure in 1788, Dolcoath was estimated to have produced tin and copper valued at least £1,250,000. Of this, £450,000 was due to copper production between 1740 and 1777. From 1799 to its final closure in 1920 its total production of minerals was valued at over £9 million - this included arsenic, silver and other minerals.

From 1853, when the first dividend on tin was paid, the mine produced over 100,000 tons of black tin. This was far in excess of the production of any other mine in Cornwall. In 1896 the mine was yielding 80 pounds of black tin per ton of rock lifted, but this gradually declined to 30 pounds by 1915 which level was maintained until the mine closed.

Because of its success, the mine paid frequent dividends to its shareholders, and its shares, which were nicknamed 'Dollies', were among the most sought-after of the industry.

Health
Workers suffered "Dolcoath" or "miner's anemia". Boycott and Haldane established in 1903 that this was not due to poor ventilation or bad air, but that the mine provided the right conditions for the condition ankylostomiasis (hookworm). They found 94% of the workforce was infected, along with telltale low haemoglobin levels, and  skin eruptions called "bunches". Workers on long underground shifts defecated in the mine shafts in humid conditions, expelling hookworm that later entered the skin of other miners  through their accidental contact with faeces, sometimes on boots, ladders or tools (often through their knees or arms as they crawled along shafts).  The mine is an important case study for epidemiologists because very rarely in Britain were conditions damp and hot enough for hookworm to propagate.

Mine captains
Richard Trevithick, (father of Richard Trevithick). Constructed the deep adit in 1765 and installed a Newcomen pumping engine in around 1775.
Andrew Vivian, cousin & collaborator of the younger Richard Trevithick (resigned 1806).
J. Rule (from 1806).
William Petherick (died January 1844).
Charles Thomas (from 1844 to 1867). Instigated the deep mining that discovered large quantities of tin ore.
Josiah Thomas (from 1867 to 1895). Son of the above, continued his father's development of the mine. In 1876 he introduced boring machines operated by compressed air, and in 1892 the first set of Californian stamps. He was appointed managing director of the mine in 1895, and died in October 1901.
Arthur Thomas (from 1895 to ?). Son of the above.

See also

South Crofty
Mining in Cornwall
Camborne School of Mines
John Harris (poet) Cornish poet

References

Sources

External links
Cornwall Record Office Online Catalogue for Dolcoath

Tin mines in Cornwall
Mining disasters in England
Copper mines in Cornwall
Disasters in Cornwall
1893 in England
1893 mining disasters
Arsenic mines in Cornwall
Camborne
Industrial archaeological sites in Cornwall